Hélder de Souza Martins (born 28 November 1901; date of death unknown) was a Portuguese horse rider who competed in the 1924 Summer Olympics, the 1928 Summer Olympics and the 1948 Summer Olympics.

In 1924 he and his horse Avro won the bronze medal as part of the Portuguese show jumping team, after finishing twelfth in the individual jumping competition. Four years later he and his horse Avro finished sixth as part of the Portuguese show jumping team, after finishing 16th in the individual jumping competition.

References

External links
profile

1901 births
Year of death missing
Portuguese male equestrians
Show jumping riders
Olympic equestrians of Portugal
Equestrians at the 1924 Summer Olympics
Equestrians at the 1928 Summer Olympics
Equestrians at the 1948 Summer Olympics
Olympic bronze medalists for Portugal
Place of birth missing
Place of death missing
Olympic medalists in equestrian
Medalists at the 1924 Summer Olympics